The Helmholtz–Kohlrausch effect (after Hermann von Helmholtz and V. A. Kohlrausch) is a perceptual phenomenon wherein the intense saturation of spectral hue is perceived as part of the color's luminance. This brightness increase by saturation, which grows stronger as saturation increases, might better be called chromatic luminance, since "white" or achromatic luminance is the standard of comparison. It appears in both self-luminous and surface colors, although it is most pronounced in spectral lights.

Lightness
Even when they have the same luminance, colored lights seem brighter to human observers than white light does. The way humans perceive the brightness of the lights is different for everyone. When the colors are more saturated, our eyes interpret it as the color's luminance and chroma. This makes us believe that the colors are actually brighter. An exception to this is when the human observer is red-green colorblind, they cannot distinguish the differences between the lightness of the colors. Certain colors do not have significant effect, however; any hue of colored lights still seem brighter than white light that has the same luminance. Two colors that do not have as great of an Helmholtz–Kohlrausch effect as the others are green and yellow.

The Helmholtz–Kohlrausch effect is affected by the viewing environment. This includes the surroundings of the object and the lighting that the object is being viewed under. The Helmholtz–Kohlrausch effect works best in darker environments where there are not any other outside factors influencing the colors. For example, this is why theaters are all dark environments.

An example of this lightness factor would be if there were different colors on a grey background that all are of the same lightness. Obviously the colors look different because they are different colors not just grey, but if the image were converted all to grey scale, all of the colors would match the grey background because they all have the same lightness.

Brightness
Brightness is affected most by what is surrounding the object. In other words, the object can look lighter or darker depending on what is around it. In addition, the brightness can also appear different depending on the color of the object. For example, an object that is more saturated will look brighter than the same object that is less saturated even when they have the same luminance.

The difference between brightness and lightness is that the brightness is the intensity of the object independent of the light source. Lightness is the brightness of the object in respect to the light reflecting on it. This is important because the Helmholtz–Kohlrausch effect is a measure of the ratio between the two.

Helmholtz color coordinates
Similar to the Munsell color system, Helmholtz designed a color coordinate system, where chromaticity is defined by dominant wavelength and purity (chroma).

The percentage of purity for each wavelength can be determined by the equation below:

 

where %P is the percent of purity, S is the point being assessed, N is the position of the white point, and DW the dominant wavelength.

Effects on industry

Entertainment
It is essential for lighting technicians to be aware of the Helmholtz–Kohlrausch effect when working in theaters or in other venues where lighting is often used. In order to get the greatest effect to illuminate their stage or theater, the lighting users need to understand that color has an effect on brightness. For example, one color may appear brighter than another but really they have the same brightness. On stage, lighting users have the ability to make a white light appear much brighter by adding a color gel. This occurs even though gels can only absorb some of the light. When lighting a stage, the lighting users tend to choose reds, pinks, and blues because they are highly saturated colors and are really very dim. However, we perceive them as being brighter than the other colors because they are most affected by the Helmholtz–Kohlrausch effect. We perceive that the color white does not look any brighter to us than individual colors. LED lights are a good example of this.

Aviation
The Helmholtz–Kohlrausch effect influences the use of LED lights in different technological practices. Aviation is one field that relies upon the results of the Helmholtz–Kohlrausch effect. A comparison of runway LED lamps and filtered and unfiltered incandescent lights all at the same luminance shows that in order to accomplish the same brightness, the white reference incandescent lamp needs to have twice the luminance of the red LED lamp, therefore suggesting that the LED lights do appear to have a greater brightness than the traditional incandescent lights. One condition that affects this theory is the presence of fog.

Automotive
Another field that uses this is the automotive industry. LEDs in the dashboard and instrument lighting are designed for use in mesopic luminance. In studies, it has been found that red LEDs appear brighter than green LEDs, which means that a driver would be able to see red light more intense thus more alerting than green lights when driving at night.

See also
Color appearance model
Bezold–Brücke shift

References

Further reading

External links
The geometry of color perception
LED Projection Enters the Mainstream

Optical phenomena
Color appearance phenomena